The 1997 All-Ireland Minor Hurling Championship was the 67th staging of the All-Ireland Minor Hurling Championship since its establishment by the Gaelic Athletic Association in 1928. The championship began on 23 April 1997 and ended on 14 September 1997.

Tipperary entered the championship as the defending champions, however, they were defeated by Galway in the All-Ireland semi-final.

On 14 September 1997 Clare won the championship following a 1-11 to 1-9 defeat of Galway in the All-Ireland final. It was their first All-Ireland title and the first to be won by a team which was beaten in the earlier rounds.

Kilkenny's Henry Shefflin was the championship's top scorer with 5-20.

The "back-door" system

Since its inception in 1928 the championship had been played on a straight knock-out basis. If any team was defeated at any stage of the provincial or All-Ireland competitions it meant automatic elimination. This system was deemed the fairest as the All-Ireland champions would always be the team who won all of their games. There were some problems with this system. Over the years Galway had become the only credible hurling team in Connacht, thus giving them an automatic pass into the All-Ireland semi-finals every year. Similarly in Ulster there were many problems as hurling was much weaker and confined to a small few counties in the north-east of the province.

In 1995 the Hurling Development Committee began investigating a way of improving hurling in general and revamping the senior and minor championships. Their proposals involved allowing the defeated Munster and Leinster finalists to re-enter the All-Ireland championship. While the two provincial final winners would automatically qualify for the All-Ireland semi-finals the two defeated provincial teams would join Galway and the Ulster champions in two play-off games or "quarter-finals". The two winners from these two games would then qualify for the semi-finals where they would be drawn against the Leinster and Munster champions. Repeat games would be avoided in the All-Ireland semi-final stage.

At the start of 1996 these proposals looked unlikely of being introduced, however, a whistle-stop tour undertaken by the committee's secretary Frank Murphy and Pat Daly, the GAA's Games Development Officer, had changed the position. In April 1996 the committee's proposals were accepted at the GAA's annual congress. Most counties supported the new proposals and motion 15 (a) was passed with more than a two-thirds majority.

Results

Leinster Minor Hurling Championship

First round

Semi-finals

Final

Munster Minor Hurling Championship

First round

Semi-final

Final

Ulster Minor Hurling Championship

Semi-final

Final

All-Ireland Minor Hurling Championship

Quarter-finals

Semi-finals

Final

Championship statistics

Top scorers

Top scorer overall

Top scorers in a single game

External links
 All-Ireland Minor Hurling Championship: Roll Of Honour
 1997 All-Ireland Minor Hurling Championship

Minor
All-Ireland Minor Hurling Championship